Sam Prince (born 27 November 1983) is a Scottish-born Australian doctor and restaurateur of Sri-Lankan descent.

Prince is known for founding the Mexican franchise chain, Zambrero. Prince’s net worth is currently 1.2 billion, ranking him number three on the Australian Financial Review Young Rich List.

Early life
Prince was born in Dundee, Scotland, and moved with his family to Australia in 1986. His parents are from Sri Lanka. He studied medicine at Monash University.

Businesses
In 2005, Prince, then a 21-year-old medical student, founded the Mexican restaurant Zambrero in his hometown of Canberra.  The chain now has over 200 outlets, most of which are in Australia.

Prince also owns the Mèjico, Indu and Kid Kyoto restaurants in Sydney, the Shine+ beverage company and Next Practice,

Philanthropy
Prince supports certain philanthropic causes, through donations made by Zambrero and Shine+, and also separate health-related NGOs including One Disease. The Zambrero "Plate 4 Plate" initiative donates a meal to charity for every retail item purchased. Zambrero has donated over 50 million meals to charity through Rise Against Hunger.

Awards and honours
Prince was named EY National and Regional Social Entrepreneur of the Year in 2018. In addition, Prince received the "Australian of the Year" for the ACT in 2012 for his Zambrero-related philanthropy. He was also awarded the Monash University Distinguished Alumni Award. Sam further received the "Most Outstanding Young Person of the World" award by the Junior Chambers International.

References

1983 births
Living people
Australian chief executives
Australian National University alumni
Australian philanthropists
Monash University alumni
Australian company founders
Australian people of Sri Lankan descent